The Medical College of Georgia Institute of Molecular Medicine and Genetics (IMMAG) is a biomedical research facility located in Augusta, Georgia.

Mission
The mission of IMMAG is to promote excellence in basic and translational biomedical research and promote a philosophy of open doors interdisciplinary collaboration.

History
The Institute of Molecular Medicine and Genetics was founded in 1993, as part of MCG's 10 year master plan.

Facilities
Facilities to support research activities have been an important feature of IMMAG from the outset. Key funding to purchase equipment located in research core facilities was obtained through the GRA, whose primary mission is to help universities in Georgia build and modernize research infrastructure through capital investments in new equipment. Several IMMAG faculty hold appointments as core faculty directors to ensure that MCG investigators have access to state-of-the-art technologies essential for biomedical research in the modern world. Core facilities administered through IMMAG include:

Cell imaging: fluorescence, confocal, and multiphoton microscopy
Transgenic Mouse & Embryonic Stem Cell
Transgenic Zebrafish
Flow Cytometry
Laser Capture Microdissection
Electron Microscopy & Histology
Proteomics & Mass Spectrometry

Funding
Funding for IMMAG comes from sources such as the National Institute of Health, the United States Department of Energy, the United States Department of Defense, the Department of Veteran Affairs, and the National Aeronautics & Space Administration.

References

External links
IMMAG website

Institute of Molecular Medicine and Genetics